The 2009–10 season was JS Kabylie's 40th season in the Algerian top flight, They competed in National 1, the Algerian Cup and the Champions League.

Squad list
Players and squad numbers last updated on 18 November 2009.Note: Flags indicate national team as has been defined under FIFA eligibility rules. Players may hold more than one non-FIFA nationality.

Competitions

Overview

{| class="wikitable" style="text-align: center"
|-
!rowspan=2|Competition
!colspan=8|Record
!rowspan=2|Started round
!rowspan=2|Final position / round
!rowspan=2|First match	
!rowspan=2|Last match
|-
!
!
!
!
!
!
!
!
|-
| National 1

|  
| 3rd
| 25 September 2010
| 8 July 2011
|-
| Algerian Cup

| Round of 64 
| Semi-finals
| 25 December 2009
| 20 April 2010
|-
| Champions League

| Preliminary round
| Second round
| 13 February 2010
| 9 May 2010
|-
! Total

National 1

League table

Results summary

Results by round

Matches

Algerian Cup

Champions League

Preliminary round

First round

Second round

Squad information

Playing statistics

|-

|-
! colspan=12 style=background:#dcdcdc; text-align:center| Players transferred out during the season

Goalscorers
Includes all competitive matches. The list is sorted alphabetically by surname when total goals are equal.

Transfers

In

Out

References

JS Kabylie seasons
JS Kabylie